Sendurai taluk is a taluk of Ariyalur district of the Indian state of Tamil Nadu. The headquarters of the taluk is the town of Sendurai.

Demographics
According to the 2011 census, the taluk of Sendurai had a population of 111,932 with 55,414  males and 56,518 females. There were 1020 women for every 1000 men. The taluk had a literacy rate of 61.6. Child population in the age group below 6 was 6,350 Males and 5,430 Females.

See also
Adhanakurichi
Anandavadi

References 

Taluks of Ariyalur district